Richard Wilson ( – 20 February 1957) was an Irish politician and farmer. He was first elected to Dáil Éireann at the 1922 general election as a Farmers' Party Teachta Dála (TD) for the Kildare–Wicklow constituency.

He was re-elected at the 1923 general election, this time representing the Wicklow constituency. He lost his seat at the June 1927 general election and was an unsuccessful candidate at the September 1927 general election. He was elected to the Seanad of the Irish Free State in 1928 as a Cumann na nGaedheal and later Fine Gael member. He remained a member until it was abolished in 1936.

Wilson had farmed sheep in the Cape Colony prior to returning to Ireland in 1912 and resuming farming in Drynam, Swords. He died 20 February 1957 in Dublin; his wife had died in January 1957. He was buried at Glasnevin Cemetery on 22 February.

References

1870s births
1957 deaths
Farmers' Party (Ireland) TDs
Irish farmers
Members of the 3rd Dáil
Members of the 4th Dáil
Members of the 1928 Seanad
Members of the 1931 Seanad
Members of the 1934 Seanad
People of the Irish Civil War (Pro-Treaty side)
Politicians from County Wicklow
Cumann na nGaedheal senators
Fine Gael senators